The .416 Barrett or 10.4×83mm centerfire rifle cartridge is a proprietary bottlenecked centrefire rifle cartridge designed in 2005. It is an alternative to the large-caliber .50 BMG in long-range high-power rifles. It was designed in response to a request for a medium/heavy rifle cartridge combination that was issued from Naval Surface Warfare Center Crane Division in late 2004.

Design
The Barrett .416 cartridge was designed by Chris Barrett, son of Ronnie Barrett, with the help of Pete Forras. The bullet was designed using some NACA low-supersonic-drag equations to design the shape.

The cartridge was designed as an improvement to the .50 BMG cartridge, a common machine gun and rifle cartridge. Because the two cartridges, the .50 BMG and .416 Barrett, have identical base dimensions, all that is needed to convert a rifle to use one or the other cartridge is a relatively quick barrel swap.

The Barrett Model 99 was initially the only commercially available rifle using the cartridge. In 2009, Zel Custom Manufacturing released the Tactilite .416 Barrett upper for AR-style rifles Zel Custom Manufacturing curtailed operations in 2018 which was subsumed by another manufacturer, McCutchen Firearms, after the BATFE classified barreled upper assemblies in .50 caliber to be firearms in and of themselves on July 17, 2018.  There is now a range of options available from several manufacturers:  Noreen Firearms makes a rifle in .416 Barrett, as does Desert Tech, and Barrett now also has a .416 Barrett option for its semi-automatic M82A1.

Performance

Barrett 398 gr solid brass boattail spitzer bullet
The use of a lighter, narrower bullet results in a significantly higher muzzle velocity and superior ballistic performance to the .50 BMG, and the .416 Barrett is claimed to retain more energy than the .50 BMG at distances over 1,000 yards. Barrett claims that this cartridge is capable of propelling a 398 gr solid brass boattail spitzer bullet out of the  barrel of a Model 99 single-shot rifle at 960 m/s (3,150 ft/s), giving it a ballistic coefficient of .720, and keeping the projectile supersonic out to 1,737 meters (1,900 yards, ~1.2 miles).

In a second-season episode of Future Weapons the host (Richard Machowicz, a former Navy SEAL) engaged in a shooting competition with another sniper. Machowicz achieved a cold-bore first-shot "kill" at 2,500 yards (2,286 m, ~1.42 miles) using a .416 Barrett Model 99 rifle while his competition, using a .50 BMG, required three shots to achieve a "kill". The .416 Barrett Model 99 rifle Mr. Machowicz used during this competition was equipped with a Barrett Optical Ranging System (BORS) module attached to the telescopic sight.

.416 Barrett MSG bullet
Improvement beyond this standard while still using standard .416 Barrett brass seems possible, but the bullets have to be specially designed. An example of such a special .416 Barrett very low drag extreme range bullet is the German CNC manufactured mono-metal 27.5 gram (424 gr) .416 Barrett MSG (G1 BC ≈ 1.103 – this ballistic coefficient (BC) is calculated by its designer, Mr. Lutz Möller, and not proven by Doppler radar measurements).

Muzzle velocity

Legality
A few jurisdictions in the United States, most notably California, New Jersey, as well as a few nations such as Argentina, Austria, Belgium, Italy, Lithuania, Netherlands, and Denmark restrict or prohibit civilian ownership of rifles chambered to use the .50 BMG cartridge, but not other calibers (e.g., .416 Barrett).

For California, Section 30905 of the California Penal Code governs exceptions/exclusions to the law:

Gallery

See also
 List of firearms
 List of rifle cartridges
 Table of handgun and rifle cartridges
 10 mm caliber
 .50 Caliber BMG Regulation Act of 2004

References

 Barrett | Ammunition

External links
TGR Co. LLC Firearms website

 
Barrett Firearms Manufacturing
Pistol and rifle cartridges
Weapons and ammunition introduced in 2005
10.4x83mm